= Guy Mhone =

Zambian-Malawian economist and intellectual

Guy C. Z. Mhone (1943–2005) was a Zambian-Malawian economist and academic. He is regarded as one of Africa's greatest development economists.
